Frank B. Wood (born 1951) is an American politician and educator from Eldridge, Iowa, who served as a state legislator in the Iowa Senate from 2005-2009, and the Iowa House of Representatives from 2014-2015.

Background
Born in Rock Island, Illinois, Wood received his bachelor's degree from Augustana College and his Master’s degree from Western Illinois University. Wood began working as a physical education teacher and coach at North Scott High School in 1973, and became activities director a year later. After earning his master's degree in education and educational leadership in administration from Western Illinois University, Wood became a principal at Riverdale High School, Port Byron, Illinois, in 1987, and later assistant principal at Rock Island High School. He returned to North Scott High School in 1999, when he was hired as assistant principal; during this time, he also assumed his old duties as activities director.

Wood served as mayor of Eldridge from 2002 until his election to the Iowa Senate in 2004. Wood was elected in 2004 with 15,500 votes (51%), defeating Republican opponent Bryan J. Sievers. He was an unsuccessful candidate for re-election in the Iowa Senate elections, 2008.

Wood served in the Iowa House of Representatives from January 2013 to January 2015 and was a Democrat.

References

External links
Project Vote Smart - Frank B. Wood profile
Follow the Money - Frank B Wood
2006 2004 campaign contributions
Iowa Senate Democrats - Frank Wood profile

1951 births
Living people
Politicians from Rock Island, Illinois
People from Scott County, Iowa
Augustana College (Illinois) alumni
Western Illinois University alumni
Democratic Party members of the Iowa House of Representatives
Democratic Party Iowa state senators
Educators from Iowa
Mayors of places in Iowa
Educators from Illinois